8tv is a common name for television networks and channels. It may refer to:

8TV (Catalonia) in Catalonia, Spain
8TV (Malaysian TV network) in Malaysia
8TV (Poland) in Poland
WISH-TV in Indianapolis, USA